Henri de Jordan (September 13, 1944 – January 31, 1996), was a French painter. Most of Henri de Jordan's career spans from 1970 to 1996.

Biography

Family

Henri de Jordan was born on September 13, 1944 in Algiers. From a painter father and a Catalans mother descended from the Güell family.

He left Algeria after a few months for the Pyrénées-Orientales. He spent his childhood between the Côte Vermeille and Cerdagne, where his taste for color and wide open spaces was born.

The artist

At the age of 13, he won first prize in "C'est Jeudi" of Jean Nohain, competition as well as the honorable mention and congratulations from the Nice auditorium jury. At the very beginning of the 1960s, he joined the École supérieure Tessier de Tours..

He was then noticed in Perpignan by Firmin Bauby in Sant Vicens. There he discovered painting on ceramics and art tapestry. He worked with Jean Picart le Doux and Jean Lurçat with whom he maintained a long friendship. There he met Dali, Picasso, etc.

At the end of the 1960s, alongside Firmin Bauby, he traveled around the world for two years in more than forty countries and territories. He brought back a pictorial enrichment that he will keep all his life. Like Paul Gauguin, the colors of French Polynesia marked him deeply. But also Brazil, Guatemala, Argentina, Mexico, Japan, Iran, India, Egypt, Lebanon, Hong Kong, New York...

Back in France, he definitively launched his career as a painter. From 1968 to 1978 he settled in Narbonne between the sea and Corbières. Then, until 1982 in Fanjeaux. Then he went to Grenoble to immerse himself in these crowns of mountains and their lights. He opened a gallery there on avenue Alsace-Lorraine. A few years later, he retired to calm in the Drôme for a few years. In 1990, he settled  in Royan in Charente-Maritime which he never left.

During his career, he exhibited all over the world.

External links 
 Fondation Firmin Bauby, Sant Vicens

20th-century French painters
20th-century French male artists
French male painters
1944 births
1996 deaths
People from Algiers